Gerson Rosenzweig (April 1861 – 14 February 1914) was a Russian-American editor, author, and poet. He is best known for his Hebrew- and Yiddish-language satires, poems, and epigrams.

Biography
Born in Białystok, Rosenzweig received his education in Berlin, Kraków, and other cities of the Russian Empire.

He conducted a Hebrew school in Suwałki, Russian Poland, before emigrating to the United States in 1888. After settling in New York City, Rosenzweig became joint editor of the Yidishes tageblatt ('Jewish Daily News'), Yidishe gazetten ('Jewish Gazette'), and Idishe velt ('Jewish World'), a position he held until 1905. He edited and published a weekly, Ha-Ivri ('The Hebrew'), from 1891 to 1898, a monthly, Kadimah ('Forward'), from 1898 to 1902, and Ha-Devorah from 1911 to 1912. He also contributed to the leading Hebrew and Yiddish papers of his time.

Rosenzweig died on 14 February 1914, after four months at the New York Skin and Cancer Hospital. The funeral, conducted by Rabbi Zvi Hirsch Masliansky, was attended by some 5,000 people. He was survived by his wife, six daughters, and one son.

Work
Rosenzweig's "masterpiece" was Massekhet Amerika, published by A. Ginsberg in New York in 1891 and by the Romm publishing house in Vilna in 1894. It was later included in his 1907 book Talmud Yankaʼi ('The Yankee Talmud'). The popular satire, written in the style of a Talmudic tractate, critiques the social conditions in New York's immigrant Jewish community. Portions of the work were printed in translation in The Sun and other New York papers. 

He published several works of poetry. These include Shirim u-meshalim (New York, 1893), a volume of poetry; Ḥamishah ve-elef mikhtamim mekoriyim (New York, 1903), a collection of 1,005 of his Hebrew epigrams and poems; and Mi-zimrat ha-aretz (1898), Hebrew translations of American national songs.

Partial bibliography

References
 

1861 births
1914 deaths
19th-century American male writers
19th-century American poets
19th-century American translators
American people of Lithuanian-Jewish descent
American satirists
Russian satirists
American magazine editors
Deaths from cancer in New York (state)
Emigrants from the Russian Empire to the United States
English–Hebrew translators
Epigrammatists
Hebrew-language poets
Jewish American writers
Jewish translators
American parodists
Russian parodists
People from Białystok
Satirists from the Russian Empire
Writers from New York City
Yiddish-language writers